Mazapertine (RWJ-37796) is an antipsychotic agent that was developed by Johnson & Johnson but never marketed.  It exerts its pharmacological effect through affinity for dopamine D2, serotonin 5-HT1A, and α1-adrenergic receptors.

Mazapertine is safe and well tolerated when administered orally.

Analogs of mazapertine with conformational restriction have been prepared and have greater affinity for the 5-HT1A receptor.

Synthesis

Alkylation of 2-Nitrophenol [88-75-5] (1) with isopropyl bromide gives 2-isopropoxynitrobenzene [38753-50-3] (2). Catalytic hydrogenation of nitro group gives 2-isopropoxyaniline [29026-74-2] (3). Intermolecular ring formation of this aniline with nornitrogen mustard [334-22-5] yields 1-(2-isopropoxyphenyl)piperazine [54013-91-1] (4). 

Amide formation of 3-(chloromethyl)benzoyl chloride [63024-77-1] (5) with piperidine gives 1-[3-(chloromethyl)benzoyl]piperidine [148583-64-6] (6).
 
Ex 1: The last step is the convergent synthesis between the above two arms of the synthesis to afford the alkylation product mazapertine (7).

References

Antipsychotics
1-Piperidinyl compounds
Piperazines
Phenol ethers
Isopropyl compounds
Carboxamides